Lachnocnema regularis, the regular woolly legs, is a butterfly of the family Lycaenidae. The nominate subspecies is only known from a single record in the Limpopo Province. Subspecies grisea is also found in Africa, including Tanzania.

The wingspan is 28–36 mm for males and 34–38 mm for females.

Subspecies
Lachnocnema regularis regularis (Angola, southern Democratic Republic of the Congo, Zambia, South Africa: Limpopo Province)
Lachnocnema regularis grisea Libert, 1996 (western and southern Tanzania)

References

Butterflies described in 1996
Taxa named by Michel Libert
Miletinae